Dancesport was an event at the 2005 Southeast Asian Games. The competition took place on November 27, 2005 in the Main Hall of the Waterfront Cebu City Hotel & Casino in Cebu City, Philippines.

Medals were contested in 2 dance categories.
 Latin American dances
 Standard dances

Dancesport was one of the new disciplines introduced in the 23rd SEA Games due to its popularity to the host country.

Medal table

Medalists

External links
Southeast Asian Games Official Results

2005 Southeast Asian Games events
Ballroom dance competitions
2005
2005 in dancesport